Jimmie Olden Johnson Jr. (born October 6, 1966) is a former American football tight end and current Offensive Coordinator Running backs coach for the San Antonio Brahmas. Johnson played college football at Howard University and professionally in the National Football League (NFL) from 1989 to 1998. He is a member of Omega Psi Phi fraternity.

Early life and college
Johnson was born and raised in Augusta, Georgia and attended T. W. Josey High School. In 1989, Johnson graduated from Howard University with a bachelor's degree in consumer studies. He played four seasons on the Howard Bison football team and was a first-team All-Mid-Eastern Athletic Conference selection in 1988 as a senior. With Howard, Johnson made 73 catches for 1,229 yards and 16 touchdowns. Johnson was also a Two Time Sheridan Broadcasting Black College All-America in 1987 and 1988.

Coaching career
Johnson began his coaching career in 2001 as running backs coach at South Carolina State University. He then became the Offensive Coordinator/QB's and Wide Receivers coach at the NCAA Division II Shaw University in 2002 and 2003. From 2004 to 2005, Johnson was the offensive coordinator and quarterbacks coach at Texas Southern University. In 2006, Johnson joined the Minnesota Vikings as the tight ends coach. He was let go by the Vikings at the end of the 2013 season after head coach Leslie Frazier was fired.

New York Jets
Johnson was named the New York Jets' tight end coach on January 29, 2015.

San Antonio Brahmas (XFL) 
Johnson was officially hired by the San Antonio Brahmas on September 13, 2022

References

External links
 

1966 births
Living people
American football tight ends
Detroit Lions players
Howard Bison football players
Kansas City Chiefs players
Minnesota Vikings coaches
New York Jets coaches
Philadelphia Eagles players
South Carolina State Bulldogs football coaches
Shaw Bears football coaches
Texas Southern Tigers football coaches
Washington Redskins players
Players of American football from Augusta, Georgia